Marijan Pušnik (born 1 November 1960) is a Slovenian football manager.

Managerial career
Pušnik started his managerial career with Dravograd in 1994 but landed his first serious job as Celje manager in 2000. During his four years at Celje, his biggest success was in the 2002–03 season when his team finished second in the 2002–03 Slovenian PrvaLiga and runners-up of the 2002–03 Slovenian Football Cup. After a few years in Iran, he returned to Slovenia and took over Maribor in 2006 with whom he eliminated Villarreal in the 2006 UEFA Intertoto Cup. In 2007, after the arrival of Zlatko Zahovič to the club, Pušnik was sacked.
After a few years of working at Rudar Velenje where he managed to finish third in the league, he went back to Iran.

In June 2015, Pušnik became the manager of Olimpija Ljubljana. After Olimpija finished the first part of the season as the leading team in the league, Pušnik fell into an argument with sporting director Ranko Stojić and was sacked in December 2015. Olimpija went on to win the title that year.

On 2 June 2016, Pušnik was announced as the new manager of Hajduk Split and thus, he became the first Slovenian manager of Hajduk Split in history.
He was sacked from Hajduk on 1 December 2016 after dropping out of the 2016–17 Croatian Football Cup quarter-finals.

On 9 March 2017, Pušnik returned to Olimpija Ljubljana, replacing Luka Elsner. He was sacked less than one month later, on 3 April 2017.

On 12 June 2017, Pušnik was announced as the new manager of Rudar Velenje.

References

External links

Living people
1960 births
Sportspeople from Slovenj Gradec
Slovenian football managers
Damash Gilan managers
NK Celje managers
NK Maribor managers
Expatriate football managers in Iran
Expatriate football managers in Japan
J2 League managers
Avispa Fukuoka managers
NK Rudar Velenje managers
NK Olimpija Ljubljana (2005) managers
Slovenian expatriate sportspeople in Austria
Expatriate football managers in Austria
Slovenian expatriate sportspeople in Croatia
Expatriate football managers in Croatia
HNK Hajduk Split managers
Slovenian expatriate football managers
Croatian Football League managers
Slovenian expatriate sportspeople in Japan
Slovenian expatriate sportspeople in Iran